Sir William Charles Fleming Robertson  (1867– 27 June 1937) was an acting governor of the Gold Coast in 1914, and a British colonial administrator, Governor of Barbados from 1925 to 1932.

Life
Robertson graduated B.A. at Trinity College, Dublin in 1889. He became inspector of schools in the Gold Coast in 1898. He took other posts there as his career developed. In 1914 he was acting governor of the Gold Coast.

In 1915 Robertson was transferred to Gibraltar, where he was Colonial Secretary; and he was moved in 1917 to Malta, serving to 1925 as Lieutenant Governor. There he warned against a rise in the bread price in 1919, ahead of riots.

Robertson died in Gibraltar.

Family
Robertson married in 1909 Elizabeth Dora Whelan, daughter of the Rev. Ernest Whelan, of Kilbride, County Wicklow. Robertson was survived by his wife, two sons and a daughter. Lady Robertson lived in a Hampton Court Palace apartment from 1947 to 1974. Their daughter Beatrice May (died 2010 at age 93) married J. A. G. Gribble of the Lancashire Fusiliers.

Notes

1867 births
1937 deaths
British colonial governors and administrators in Africa
British colonial governors and administrators in the Americas
British colonial governors and administrators in Europe
Governors of Barbados